The Sorge is a right affluent of river Eider in Schleswig-Holstein, Germany.

It is formed by the confluence of two streams or small rivers. The shorter one is called Stente. It is the outlet of a lake called Bistensee. Half way it passes the mill's pond of the hamlet of Stenten. Below this pond it was called "Sorge", too, as late as in official maps printed in the year 2000. The other top tributary is longer, . Its upper section is called Boklunder Au, the lower one Mühlenau, in 2000 still Mühlenbach. But there is another Mühlenbach (mill stream), nearby, joining river Sorge from the left (i. e. southern) side.

From the confluence of its sources, river Sorge mainly flows westward. In the moraine region of Geest, it is crossed by the historical Oxen Way, as Hærvejen is called in Germany. West of it and much more in the marshes west of Tetenhusen, the course of the river underwent great changes since the  early 17th century, due to the cultivation efforts of Dutch settlers. Parts of the old course have disappeared, but a significant rest, up river cut off the waterway and called Alte Sorge, is a natural reserve, now.

See also
List of rivers of Schleswig-Holstein

Rivers of Schleswig-Holstein
Federal waterways in Germany
Rivers of Germany